"My Heart Goes Boom (La Di Da Da)" is a song by German dance-pop act French Affair. It was released in January 2000 as the lead single from their debut album, Desire (2000). The song became a hit worldwide, topping the charts of Germany and Austria and reaching the top five in Denmark, France, Italy, Spain, and Switzerland. Although the song is mostly sung in English, it contains a verse in French.

Music video
The accompanying music video for "My Heart Goes Boom (La Di Da Da)" was directed by Wiebke Berndt.

Track listings
 CD maxi – Europe
 "My Heart Goes Boom (La Di Da Da)" (radio version) – 3:39
 "My Heart Goes Boom (La Di Da Da)" (X-tended club version) – 5:39
 "My Heart Goes Boom (La Di Da Da)" (K's house remix) – 7:02

 CD maxi – US
 "My Heart Goes Boom (La Di Da Da)" (radio edit) – 3:40
 "My Heart Goes Boom (La Di Da Da)" (Plasmic honey radio edit) – 3:03
 "My Heart Goes Boom (La Di Da Da)" (Plasmic honey big boom mix) – 7:53
 "My Heart Goes Boom (La Di Da Da)" (Plasmic honey big boom dub) – 7:13
 "My Heart Goes Boom (La Di Da Da)" (Bastone & Bernstein club mix) – 7:58
 "My Heart Goes Boom (La Di Da Da)" (sharp boys festival mix) – 6:24

 12-inch maxi
 "My Heart Goes Boom (La Di Da Da)" (X-tended club version) – 5:39
 "My Heart Goes Boom (La Di Da Da)" (K's house remix) – 7:02
 "My Heart Goes Boom (La Di Da Da)" (Sharp festival remix) – 6:31

 CD single
 "My Heart Goes Boom (La Di Da Da)" (radio version) – 3:39
 "My Heart Goes Boom (La Di Da Da)" (K's house remix) – 7:02

Credits
 Artwork (cover) – Goutte
 Lyrics By – B. Alcindor
 Lyrics By, Music By – K. Dreyer / T. Dreyer
 Photography – Kramer & Giogoli
 Producer, arranged by, mixed by – The Dreyer Bros.

Charts and certifications

Weekly charts

Year-end charts

Certifications

See also
 List of number-one hits of 2000 (Austria)
 List of number-one hits of 2000 (Germany)

References

1999 songs
2000 debut singles
Bertelsmann Music Group singles
Franglais songs
French Affair songs
Number-one singles in Austria
Number-one singles in Germany
RCA Records singles